Beach volleyball competitions at the 2022 Bolivarian Games in Valledupar, Colombia will be held from 2 to 5 July 2022 at Parque de la Leyenda Vallenata beach volleyball courts.

Two medal events are scheduled to be contested: a men's and women's tournaments. A total of 48 athletes (26 athletes–13 teams for men and 22 athletes–11 teams for women) will compete in the events. Both tournaments are open competitions without age restrictions.

Pairs José Gregorio Gómez-Rolando Hernandez from Venezuela and Michelle Valiente-Patricia Caballero from Paraguay are the defending men's and women's gold medalists, respectively.

Participating nations
A total of 8 nations (6 ODEBO nations and 2 invited) registered teams for the beach volleyball events. Each nation was able to enter a maximum of 8 athletes (two teams of 2 athletes each per gender). Hosts Colombia, Ecuador and Venezuela entered 4 teams each, Chile and Peru entered 3 teams each and Dominican Republic, Panama and Paraguay 2 teams each. The participation of Bolivia and Guatemala was expected, but eventually they did no register teams.

Teams

Medal summary

Medal table

Medalists

Venue
All matches in both events will be played at the beach volleyball courts of the Parque de la Leyenda Vallenata in Valledupar.

Groups composition
The pools for both events were conformed as follows:

Men's tournament

The men's tournament will be held from 2–5 July 2022 and consists of a group stage and a final stage.

All match times are in COT (UTC−5).

Group stage
The group stage consists of three groups of three and one group of four, each group is played under round-robin format with the top two teams progressing to the quarter-finals.

Pool A

Pool B

Pool C

Pool D

Final stage
The final stage consists of the quarter-finals, semi-finals and the bronze and gold medal matches. The quarter-finals match-ups are: 
Quarter-final 1: Winners Pool B v Runners-up Group C
Quarter-final 2: Winners Pool D v Runners-up Group A
Quarter-final 3: Winners Pool A v Runners-up Group D
Quarter-final 4: Winners Pool C v Runners-up Group B

The semi-finals match-ups are:
Semifinal 1: Winners Quarter-final 1 v Winners Quarter-final 2
Semifinal 2: Winners Quarter-final 3 v Winners Quarter-final 4

Winners of semi-finals will play the gold medal match, while losers will play the bronze medal match.

Quarter-finals

Semi-finals

Bronze medal match

Gold medal match

Women's tournament

The women's tournament will be held from 2–5 July 2022 and consists of a group stage and a final stage.

All match times are in COT (UTC−5).

Group stage
The group stage consists of one group of three and two groups of four, each group is played under round-robin format with the top two teams plus the two best third-placed teams advanced to the quarter-finals.

Pool A

Pool B

Pool C

Final stage
The final stage consists of the quarter-finals, semi-finals and the bronze and gold medal matches. The quarter-finals match-ups are: 
Quarter-final 1 (match 16): Best first-placed team v 2nd best third-placed team 
Quarter-final 2 (match 17): Best second-placed team v 2nd best second-placed team
Quarter-final 3 (match 18): 3rd best first-placed team v 3rd best second-placed team
Quarter-final 4 (match 19): 2nd best first-placed team v Best third-placed team

The semi-finals match-ups are:
Semifinal 1 (match 20): Winners Quarter-final 1 v Winners Quarter-final 2
Semifinal 2 (match 21): Winners Quarter-final 3 v Winners Quarter-final 4

Winners of semi-finals will play the gold medal match, while losers will play the bronze medal match.

Quarter-finals

Semi-finals

Bronze medal match

Gold medal match

References

External links
Bolivarianos Valledupar 2022 Beach volleyball

Beach volleyball
Bolivarian Games